Ayatullah Syed Zafrul Hasan Rizvi (آیت اللہ سید ظفر الحسن ظفر الملّت رحمت الله علیہ), popularly known as Zafrul Millat (ظفر الملّت) was born on 13 September 1911 (21st Ramadhanul Mubarak, 1329 H) in Khateebpur, Sagri, Azamgarh. His father Maulana Syed Zameerul Hasan Rizvi son of Syed Tasdeequl Hasan Rizvi was also a religious scholar.

Initial study
Zafrul Millat obtained his initial religious education under the patronage of his parents. At the age of 12 he went to Madresae Islamia Nizamabad and then moved to Madrasae Imania, Banaras. At the age of 18 he went to Sultanul Madaris, Lucknow and obtained the degree "Sadrul Afadhil" from Sultanul Madaris in 1935.

Dars-e-Kharij
In 1937, Zafrul Millat went to Hawzae-ilmiya Najaf-al-Ashraf and joined the darsi-kharij of Ayatollah Abdul Hussain Rushti, Ayatollah Syed Abul Hasan Isfahani, Ayatollah Syed Jawad Tabrezi, Ayatollah Syed Jamal Gulpaygani. He returned to India in 1940 with Sanad-e-Ijtehad.

Teachers

 Maulana Sagheerul Hasan Qibla (Madrasae Islamiya'h, Nizamabad)
 Ahsa'nul Atqiya Maulana Rajjan Qibla (Madrasae Imaniya, Banaras)
 Ayatullah Hakim Syed Nazir Hasan Rizvi Gopalpuri (Principle Of Madarsa Imaniya Banaras) 
 Hujjatol Islam Maulana Mohammad Hadi Qibla (Sultanul Madaris, Lucknow)
 Hujjatol Islam Maulana Syed Mohammad Qibla (Sultanul Madaris, Lucknow)
 Faqeeh-e-Asr Maulana Syed Alim Husain Qibla (Sultanul Madaris, Lucknow)
 Maulana Abdul Husain Qibla (Sultanul Madaris, Lucknow)
 Fareeduz Zama'n Allama Syed Ibne Hasan Qibla (Sultanul Madaris, Lucknow)
 Waheedul Asr Maulana Syed Altaf Haider Qibla (Sultanul Madaris, Lucknow)
 Ayatollah Abdul Husain Rishti(Hawzae Ilmiya'h Najaf-al-Ashraf, Iraq)
 Ayatollah Syed Razauddin Iraqi(Hawzae Ilmiya'h Najaf-al-Ashraf, Iraq)
 Ayatollah Syed Jawad Tabrezi (Hawzae Ilmiya'h Najaf-al-Ashraf, Iraq)
 Ayatollah Ibraheem Rushti Gharvi(Hawzae Ilmiya'h Najaf-al-Ashraf, Iraq)
 Ayatollah Syed Jawad Gulpaygani(Hawzae Ilmiya'h Najaf-al-Ashraf, Iraq)
 Ayatollah Syed Abdullah Shirazi(Hawzae Ilmiya'h Najaf-al-Ashraf, Iraq)

Indian origin class-fellows at Najaf-al-Ashraf, Iraq

 Hujjatol Islam wal Muslimeen Maulana Naseerul Hasan Qibla alias "Nasee'rul-Millat"
 Mujtahid Maulana Mohsin Nawab Qibla alias "Mohsinul-Millat"
 Mujtahid Maulana Wasi Mohammad Abidi Qibla Faizabadi alias "Fakhrul Atqiya'h wa Ziy'a-ul-Millat"
 Mujtahid Maulana Sa'eedul Hasan Qibla alias "Sa'eedul-Millat" (author of last volume of Abaqatul-anwar)
 Maulana Sa'adat Husain Khan Qibla "Iftekharululema"

Official designations and roles
 Sadrul Mudarreseen, Madrasae Babul Ilm, Mubarakpoor.(1935–37)
 Vice-principal, Madrasae Jawadia, Banaras. (1940–1948)
 Principal, Madrasae Jawadia, Banaras.(1948-till his death)

Books written

 Shar'he Kifayatul Usool (2 Volumes)
 Intezar-e-Qaime-Aale-Mohammad ba-jawaabe-Zahoor-e-Qa'em(3 Volumes).
 Tarjuma Khutbae Mo'jezah Baqaid Bila Alif (Miraculous Translation of Miraculous Sermon of Imam Ali a.s. – Khutbae Bila-Alif)
 Debates with scholars of other School of Islam.
 Answers to questions related to religious and jurisprudence subjects (Istift'a).

Activities

Ayatollah Syed Zafrul Hasan served his whole life in the service of his Lord and his chosen ones. He used to take care of Orphans and Widows and till today Jawadia Arabic College is helping poor and needy people.

Ayatollah Syed Zafrul Hasan had answered hundreds of letters (istifta') received from distant areas of sub-continent, seeking answers related to religious, social, economical affairs of Shi'a community.

He used to orate Majalis of Imam Husain a.s throughout the year in different areas of sub-continent.

Death
He died on January 1, 1983 (corresponding to 16th of Rabi-ul-Awwal 1403 AH).

On his demise, various famous spiritual personalities sent their letter of grief and condolence, like Ayatullah al Uzma Syed al-Khoei on his death.

References

External links
 Sultanul Madaris Official Website
 Tarjuma Khutbae Mo'jezah Baqaid Bila Alif

People from Uttar Pradesh
Indian grand ayatollahs
Indian Shia Muslims
1910 births
1983 deaths